William Farrow may refer to:

 Bill Farrow (1918–2003), American basketball player
 William G. Farrow (1918–1942), United States Army Air Corps officer
 William H. Farrow (1893–1946), British World War I flying ace
 William McKnight Farrow (1885–1967), American artist and curator